Joakim Nyström was the defending champion, but lost to Thomas Muster in the second round.

Mats Wilander won the title, defeating Jimmy Arias 4–6, 7–5, 6–1, 6–3 in the final.

Seeds
All sixteen seeds received a bye to the second round.

Draw

Finals

Top half

Section 1

Section 2

Bottom half

Section 3

Section 4

References

External links
 Main draw

1987 Monte Carlo Open